Satellite Town, Lagos is a community and state housing estate located along the Lagos-Badagry Expressway in Amuwo-Odofin local government area of Lagos State. Its ZIP code is 102262.

History
In early 1960, the Lagos State Government set up Satellite Town to help low income earners own their own houses, with some of the areas allocated to oil workers and private buyers.

Infrastructures
The deplorable state of roads and illegal structures in Satellite Town shows that what was once known to be an estate has, over time, turned into a slum. There were reports that in May 2009, the Lagos State government awarded contracts to help stop flooding, which is a major problem in that area.

See also
 Awori District settlements

References

Populated places in Lagos State
Geography of Lagos
Housing estates in Lagos